Isaac Correia da Costa (born 25 April 1991) is an Angolan footballer who plays for C.D. Primeiro de Agosto and the Angola national football team.

International career
Isaac made his senior international debut on 3 June 2012 in a world cup qualification 1-1 home draw against Cameroon.

Honors

Club
Primeiro de Agosto
Girabola Champion: 2018

References

External links

1991 births
Living people
Atlético Petróleos de Luanda players
C.D. Primeiro de Agosto players
Girabola players
Angolan footballers
Angola international footballers
Association football defenders
Footballers from Luanda
2019 Africa Cup of Nations players
Angola A' international footballers
2016 African Nations Championship players